Areyonga may refer to:

Areyonga, a genus of prehistoric fishes, synonym of Areyongalepis
Areyonga (insect), a genus of insects in the family Ichneumonidae
Areyonga, Northern Territory, a community in Australia